Tree Island may refer to:
 Tree Island, South China Sea, Hainan, People's Republic of China
 Tree Island, Queensland, Australia
 Tree Island (British Columbia), an island in the lower Fraser River, British Columbia
 Tree Island is a local name for Sandy Island, the core island of Sandy Island Marine Provincial Park, Canada
 Tree Island (novel), by Linda Grover
 Tree Island, also known as Pak Chau, Tuen Mun District, New Territories, Hong Kong
 Tree island, a variety of tropical hardwood hammock found in the Florida Everglades